The historic Grosse Point Light is located in Evanston, Illinois. Following several shipping disasters near Evanston, residents successfully lobbied the federal government for a lighthouse. Construction was completed in 1873. The lighthouse was added to the National Register of Historic Places on September 8, 1976. On 20 January 1999, the lighthouse was designated a National Historic Landmark.  It is maintained under the jurisdiction of the Evanston Lighthouse Park District, an independent taxing authority.

History

Impetus
The United States government agreed to construct the lighthouse at Grosse Point after several maritime disasters near the area showed need for it. Shoals were a real hazard, and ship traffic was increasing concurrent with development in the Midwest, the growth of Chicago, the aftermath of the Chicago Fire, and the increased trade and exploitation of natural resources throughout the Great Lakes. Particularly influential was the 1860 sinking of the Lady Elgin, a disaster which claimed more than 300 lives. The citizens of Evanston petitioned the government for the light station, but the Civil War (1861-1865) delayed any funding for the project. Lighthouses in Chicago proper were proving themselves insufficient, so there was a perceived need for action.

Construction
The project to construct a lighthouse began in 1872, supervised by Orlando Metcalf Poe, who designed the buildings. Most of the construction was completed by June 30, 1873, although the lamp would not be lit for several months. Finally, in March 1874, the light commenced operation. The building is designed in Italianate architecture.

In summer 1865 Colonel Poe became the Lighthouse Board's chief engineer; in 1870 he was promoted to the position of Chief Engineer of the Upper Great Lakes 11th Lighthouse District. In this capacity he designed eight "Poe style lighthouses" and oversaw construction of several. Poe was named District Engineer for the Eleventh Lighthouse District, Those lights are New Presque Isle Light (1870) on Lake Huron, Lake Michigan's South Manitou Island Light (1872), Grosse Point Light (1873) in Evanston, Illinois, Lake Superior's Au Sable Light (1874), Outer Island Light (1874) in the Apostle Islands, Little Sable Point Light (1874) on Lake Michigan, Cheboygan County, Michigan's Spectacle Reef Light {1874} on Lake Huron, Racine, Wisconsin's Wind Point Light (1880); and Manistique, Michigan's Seul Choix Light (1895).

Deactivation and conversion to private aid to navigation
In 1935, the federal government turned over the grounds and the buildings, except for the lighthouse tower and light, to the city of Evanston. In 1941, the Grosse Point Light Station was decommissioned by the United States Coast Guard as a precaution against possible air raids in the wake of the attack on Pearl Harbor. After the decommissioning, the city received the tower and the light. But the lease allows the government to take the light station back if they ever needed it for official use.

The light was reignited in 1945 and has served as a secondary navigational aid ever since. The lighthouse is operated by the Lighthouse Park District of Evanston, Illinois, once known as the Northeast Park District, but since renamed in honor of the lighthouse.

Illinois has two well-known and historic light stations in the Chicago area, plus two pierhead lights. Chicago has no area lighthouse preservation group, and this light has been the primary beneficiary of preservation efforts in the area. The Calumet Harbor Light—just across the border in Indiana, and one of eleven past or present lighthouses in Indiana, was demolished in 1995.

Architecture and design

Light tower
The Gross Point Light's primary structure is the conical light tower. The tower's two outer walls include an inner air space between them. The tower lantern is of glass and iron construction and is topped by a copper sheeting roof.

Lantern and optics
The second order Fresnel lens  is the largest lens (one of five) placed on the Great Lakes, which underscores the importance of this light. The lens was manufactured by Henry-Lepaute Company of Paris. It is still in place, which makes it unique; it has been said that this is the single remaining 2nd Order Fresnel lens that is still in place and in service on the Great Lakes.

This is one of only 70 such Fresnel lenses that are still operational in the United States, sixteen of which are in use on the Great Lakes of which eight are in Michigan.

Grosse Point legends
The site of the Grosse Point Lighthouse is the purported site where Father Jacques Marquette landed in 1674 during his trip down the west side of Lake Michigan to visit various Illinois Native American tribes. This tale is largely anecdotal as there is no real historical proof that this ever occurred.

There is also an interesting legend associated with the Fresnel lens at Grosse Point. This lens was one of three purchased from France in 1860. One was sent to California, and the remaining two went to Florida where new lighthouses were under construction. The Civil War was fast approaching and, according to the story, federal troops wanted to safeguard the lenses and so they were buried in an isolated spot before the war and were later retrieved and sent to Washington D.C. In 1874 one of the historic two was installed at Grosse Point Lighthouse. There is little documentation to substantiate or disprove that the chain of events actually occurred. The Evanston Index for October 23, 1880, reported that Mr. Crump, an official lampist for the Lighthouse Establishment’s Twelfth District, was in town and had “confirmed the explosion of the pretty fiction which long obtained here, concerning the burying of our Evanston light in the sands during the Civil War.” Official as his statement might seem, there currently are no records available to prove the incident did not take place. Terras, Donald J. "Grosse Point Lighthouse: Landmark To Maritime History and Culture" (Windy City Press, 1995)

Current activities

The dwelling and tower are opened during summer weekends for tours.

See also
Lighthouses in the United States
National Historic Lighthouse Preservation Act
List of National Historic Landmarks in Illinois

References

Further reading

 Andreas, A.T. (1884) History of Chicago from the Earliest Period to the Present Time,
 Chicago's Front Door, Chicago Public Library Digital Collection, website.
 Chicago, Scribner's Monthly (September 1875) Vol. X, No. 5.
 Hyde, Charles K., and Ann and John Mahan. (1995) The Northern Lights: Lighthouses of the Upper Great Lakes.  Detroit: Wayne State University Press.  .
 Havighurst, Walter (1943) The Long Ships Passing: The Story of the Great Lakes, Macmillan Publishers.
 Karamanski, T. Ed., Historic Lighthouses and Navigational Aids of the Illinois Shore of Lake Michigan Loyola University Chicago & Illinois Historic Preservation Agency, (1989).
 Longstreet, Stephen (1973) Chicago 1860-1919 (New York: McKay).
 Lopez, Victor. "This Old Lighthouse: Chicago Harbor Beacon Gets a Facelift." Coast Guard (September, 1997), pp. 24–25.
 Mayer, Harold M. (1957) The Port of Chicago University of Chicago Press.
 
 Rice, Mary J., Chicago: Port to the World (Follet Publishers, 1969).
 Sapulski, Wayne S., (2001) Lighthouses of Lake Michigan: Past and Present (Paperback) (Fowlerville: Wilderness Adventure Books) ; .
 Taylor, Paul (October 2009) Orlando M. Poe: Civil War General and Great Lakes Engineer (Kent State University Press) ; .

 

Terras, Donald J. (1995) "Grosse Point Lighthouse: Landmark to Maritime History and Culture" (Hard Cover) (Windy City Press)

External links
 
 
Lighthouse Park District of Evanston. 
Grosse Point Lighthouse
Survey number HABS IL-1212 - Grosse Point Lighthouse, 2601 Sheridan Road, Evanston, Cook County, IL
Terras, Donald J., "Grosse Point Light Station Study", National Historic Landmark, 1999.
Satellite view of Grosse Point Light, Google earth
Terry Pepper, Seeing the Light, Grosse Point Light.

Lighthouses completed in 1873
Lighthouses on the National Register of Historic Places in Illinois
Buildings and structures on the National Register of Historic Places in Cook County, Illinois
National Historic Landmarks in Illinois
National Historic Landmark lighthouses
Buildings and structures in Evanston, Illinois
Transportation buildings and structures in Cook County, Illinois
1873 establishments in Illinois